Senator Sutherland may refer to:

Members of the United States Senate
George Sutherland (1862–1942), U.S. Senator from Utah from 1905 to 1917
Howard Sutherland (1865–1950), U.S. Senator from West Virginia from 1917 to 1923

U.S. state and territorial senate members
Daniel Sutherland (1869–1955), Alaska Territorial Senate
Dean Sutherland (born 1954), Washington State Senate
Edmund G. Sutherland (1815–1883), New York State Senate
George Eaton Sutherland (1843–1899), Wisconsin State Senate
James Sutherland (Wisconsin politician) (1820–1905), Wisconsin State Senate
Joel Barlow Sutherland (1792–1861), Pennsylvania State Senate
Kenneth F. Sutherland (1888–1954), New York State Senate
Solomon Sutherland (1762–1802), New York State Senate